Utåker is a village in Kvinnherad municipality in Vestland county, Norway. The village is located where the Skåneviksfjorden splits into the Matersfjorden and Åkrafjorden.

The village of Skånevik lies to the south, across the fjord. The village is a ferry port, with regular routes from Skånevik to Sunde i Matre to Utåker.  Utåker Church is located in this village.

References

Villages in Vestland
Kvinnherad